Aliciella penstemonoides (syn. Gilia penstemonoides) is a species of flowering plant in the phlox family known by the common names Black Canyon gilia and beardtongue gilia. It is endemic to Colorado in the United States.

This species is a perennial herb with stems growing up to 15 centimeters tall. There is a rosette of leaves around the base of the plant. The leaves are linear to lance-shaped and measure up to 5 centimeters in length. They are sometimes lobed. Smaller, narrow leaves occur higher on the stem. The branching inflorescence contains purple, blue, or nearly white flowers, each about a centimeter long.

This species is distributed throughout five Colorado counties, with the center of distribution in Black Canyon of the Gunnison National Park and along the Gunnison River. There are about 28 occurrences. Fourteen are on National Park Service lands, eight are on United States Forest Service lands, and five are on Bureau of Land Management lands. Only one is on privately owned land.

This plant grows on steep to vertical cliffsides in river canyons. It anchors in rock cracks. It grows at up to 10,000 feet in elevation. Other plants on the canyon walls include Arabis crandallii, Arenaria fendleri, Artemisia frigida, Artemisia ludoviciana, Heterotheca horrida, Heterotheca villosa, Holodiscus dumosus, Oryzopsis micrantha, Ribes cereum, and Selaginella densa. There are ferns, mosses, and lichens in some areas.

The threats to this species are not well known. Some occurrences are safe from most types of human interference because they grow on inaccessible cliff faces. Several occurrences are located near recreational areas used for hiking, fishing, and rock climbing. Two occurrences were extirpated when the Blue Mesa Reservoir was created.

References

External links

penstemonoides
Flora of Colorado